Lucy Ayoub (born 21 June 1992) is an Israeli television presenter, poet and radio host, formerly of the Israeli Public Broadcasting Corporation (IPBC) and currently working for Keshet Media Group. Ayoub co-hosted the Eurovision Song Contest 2019 alongside Assi Azar, Bar Refaeli and Erez Tal.

Early life 
Ayoub was born in Haifa, Israel. She is the daughter of an Arab-Christian father, and an Ashkenazi Jewish mother who converted to Christianity upon their marriage. Ayoub has one brother and three sisters. Her paternal grandmother was the daughter of Palestinian refugees who fled to Lebanon during the 1948 Arab-Israeli War, leaving her in a convent in Israel, and later was adopted by a prosperous Arab-Christian woman named Lucy Khayat. Her maternal grandparents were Holocaust survivors: her maternal grandfather had been in a Nazi concentration camp, while her maternal grandmother from Romania survived among partisans as a child. Ayoub celebrates both the Christian and Jewish holidays with different parts of her family, while personally being an atheist, saying "I’m an atheist and it means nothing to me that I was baptized [in church]". She attended a Catholic Carmelites school in Haifa. She wrote stories and poems in both Arabic and Hebrew.

Ayoub was enlisted in the Israel Defense Forces, serving for two years as a flight simulator instructor in the Israeli Air Force.

Since 2016, she has studied philosophy, politics, economics, and law at the Tel Aviv University.

Career

She first gained public attention in 2016, when she read several pieces of her poetry in the framework of the Poetry Slam Israel competition. In the same year, she joined the Israeli Public Broadcasting Corporation (IPBC) and started writing and submitting videos. In 2017, Ayoub began to host a weekly cultural programme on the radio station. In the same year, she began hosting the daily TV programme Culture Club on Kan 11.

Ayoub was the jury spokesperson for Israel in the Eurovision Song Contest 2018, where her presentation caused a media reaction due to the response of the Israeli Minister of Culture and Sport, Miri Regev, who protested against the fact that Ayoub spoke Arabic during the live broadcast and did not mention Jerusalem.

Ayoub hosted the green room (artists' backstage) of the Eurovision Song Contest 2019 in Tel Aviv alongside Assi Azar, whereas Erez Tal and Bar Refaeli hosted the main event. Before that, on 28 January, Ayoub and Azar hosted the contest's semi-final allocation draw at the Tel Aviv Museum of Art.

She plays a role in the fourth season of the Netflix series Fauda.

In November 2021, she announced her departure from the IPBC for Keshet.

Personal life
As of 2017, she resides in Tel Aviv with her Jewish-Israeli boyfriend Etay Bar.

Ayoub speaks both Arabic and Hebrew. She says of her self-identity in poetry: "[S]ome of you will say I will always be the daughter of the Arab, and at the same time, in the eyes of others, I will always be the daughter of the Jewess. So do not suddenly tell me that I can not be both."

See also
 List of Eurovision Song Contest presenters

References

External links
 

Living people
1992 births
Arab atheists
Israeli radio presenters
Israeli women radio presenters
Israeli television presenters
Israeli journalists
Israeli women journalists
Israeli women poets
Israeli poets
People from Haifa
Tel Aviv University alumni
Israeli Arab Jews
Jewish atheists
Arab citizens of Israel
Israeli people of Romanian-Jewish descent
Israeli people of Ashkenazi descent
Israeli atheists
Israeli women television presenters
Israeli Arab journalists
Spoken word artists